, also known as Mount Mikasa (三笠山 Mikasa-yama), is a  hill located to the east of Nara Park in the city of Nara, Nara Prefecture, Japan. The mountain's name literally means "young grass". The mountain is closed from December 12th to March 17th and cannot be accessed.

On the fourth Saturday of each January, the dead grass of Mount Wakakusa is burned in an annual festival known as Yamayaki (山焼き literally "mountain burning").  The tradition supposedly originated from a boundary dispute between two temples, Tōdai-ji and Kōfuku-ji in 1760; after mediation failed, the entire mountain was set ablaze. Other explanations suggest that the extermination of wild boar or other pests was the original purpose. The festival today begins with a ceremonial igniting by representatives of both temples, followed by a fireworks display. The festival has sometimes been postponed or cancelled because of poor weather or during wartime.

Locations to view the Yamayaki Festival
The burning of Mount Wakakusa as part of the annual festival can be seen from the city of Nara and many other locations in the northern part of the Nara Basin. It can be viewed at a further distance from the Aeon Mall Yamato-kōriyama multilevel parking lot, and from buildings in the cities of Kashihara and Gose. The blazing hillside is also visible from Mount Kongō, Mount Ikoma, Hōzan-ji and the  ryokan street directly below it. The most popular viewing locations, however, include Nara Park near the five-storied pagoda of Kōfuku-ji, Oike pond near Yakushi-ji, and Heijō Palace.

Gallery

References

External links 
 Mt. Wakakusa, from The Official Nara Travel Guide

Wakakusa